The Decameron is a 1971 anthology film written and directed by Pier Paolo Pasolini, based on the 14th-century allegory by Giovanni Boccaccio. It is the first film of Pasolini's Trilogy of Life, the others being The Canterbury Tales and Arabian Nights. Each film was an adaptation of a different piece of classical literature focusing on ribald and often irreligious themes. The tales contain abundant nudity, sex, slapstick and scatological humour.

Pasolini's intention was not to faithfully recreate the world of Boccaccio's characters but to criticise the contemporary world through metaphorical use of the themes present in the stories. Stories are often changed to southern Italy and heavy use of the Neapolitan dialect is used to signify the mistreatment and economic exploitation of the poorer region by the richer northern parts of Italy.

The film was entered into the 21st Berlin International Film Festival, where it won the Silver Bear Extraordinary Jury Prize. Despite the success and critical acclaim of this film, Pasolini was upset with the numerous low quality knock offs and remakes it generated. He considered these an affront to the anti-capitalist message of the film and would disown this film in his final days before dying.

Plot
Prologue:
The film, shot in Neapolitan dialect at the behest of the director, offers a variety of episodes from the stories in Giovanni Boccaccio's book, and are linked through a pupil of the painter Giotto (played by Pasolini himself) who arrives in Naples to paint a mural.

The credits roll while the song-play Zesa Viola o La Zita in cerca di un marito is played over top. The Neapolitan ballad is about a maid searching for a husband. The film begins with Ser Ciappelletto (who returns later in the film) committing a murder and hiding a dead body. The scene then transitions to the story of Andreuccio.

Andreuccio of Perugia:
In the first episode (based on Second day, fifth tale), Andreuccio of Perugia has come to Naples to buy horses. A rich lady learns of this from one of her older servants and devises a trick to con him of his money. She invites him over to her home for supper under the pretext that they are long lost siblings. After supper they both retire to bed and Andreuccio gets into his nightshirt and puts his clothes and money on the bed. He then goes to use the restroom where he falls through a trap door and is dropped into a trough of excrement. The young man escapes and meets two thieves who are attempting a robbery at a nearby church to steal the jewels from the tomb of the Archbishop  who died a few days earlier. Andreuccio is persuaded to participate and enters the tomb to steal the jewels. He finds the bishop's prized ring and keeps it for himself. He tells the others he couldn't find it and they know he is lying. They shut the door on him enclosing him in certain death. He screams out to no avail. Later, another group of robbers enter with the exact same plan of stealing the jewels from the tomb. Andreuccio hears this and lays in wait. The lead robber asks the other two to enter the tomb but they refuse. He calls them chicken and mocks them for being afraid. He tells them "dead men don't bite" when hearing this, Andreuccio pops up and bites the robber's leg. The three robbers run away in terror while Andreuccio jumps up out of the tomb afterward and prances away with his new ring.

Ciappelletto, the Thief: In Naples, an old man is reading to an interested crowd a bawdy story (based on Ninth day, second tale) in Neapolitan. In a convent, a nun is having a sexual affair with a male visitor. When the other nuns discover this they rush to snitch on her to the Mother Superior. The Mother Superior who was sleeping with a priest is awakened by knocking on her door in the middle of the night and quickly gets dressed. She accidentally puts his underpants on her head mistaking it for her veil and rushes out of the door. The Mother Superior begins scolding the nun but she points out the underpants and the nuns all realize the Mother Superior is guilty of the same sin. From that day forth, the nuns all get lovers.

While this story is being told, Ser Ciappelletto is picking pockets of men caught up in the story. He gives some money to a male child in exchange for sexual intercourse and the scene ends.

Masetto da Lamporecchio:
In the second episode (based on Third day, First tale), a young man, Masetto da Lamporecchio, is encouraged by a gardener to seek work at a local convent filled with many beautiful women. The young man gets the idea to pretended to be deaf and dumb to get inside as the abbess doesn't want handsome young men in the convent but will take exception for a deaf mute who she sees as non-threatening. He gets the job and while tending the garden two nuns decide to use him for sex because he can not rat on them. The other sisters watch this and get the idea to join in. The sisters prove insatiable, and the young man finally breaks his silence to protest to the abbess that he cannot keep up with their demands. The abbess declares his sudden ability to speak a miracle from God, but this is merely an excuse to keep the young man at the convent.

Peronella:
In the third episode (based on Seventh day, second tale), the commoner Peronella makes a cuckold of her dimwitted husband Giannello. While she is having sex with her lover, Giannello unexpectedly comes home. Hearing the husband knocking, the other man hides in a large pot. Peronella opens the door and yells at Giannello for coming home so early from work. Giannello explains that it is the feast day of San Galeone so there was no work to be had. Instead he found a new buyer for the large pot they own (in which the lover is hiding still unbeknown to Giannello). Peronella devises a scheme to explain her lover in the pot and tells Giannello that she already has a buyer and that he is inspecting the pot. She tells him she sold it for seven denarii which is more than Giannello had sold it to his buyer. The husband accepts this and tells his buyer to leave as the pot is already sold. Giannello goes to the pot room where the hidden lover pops out and yells at him that the inside of the pot is dirty. The wife tells the husband to clean it before selling it. Giannello enters the pot and while he is inside the pot, his wife and her lover loudly and passionately have intercourse next to it. The wife points around at different spots of the jar and tells her husband to scrape them all good until he finds the "right spot". Her orders to clean the jar are the same as the directions for her lover to penetrate her. The husband however remains oblivious to this and laughs to himself.

Ser Ciappelletto of Prato:
In the fourth episode (based on First day, first tale), which begins in Prato, Ser Ciappelletto, a Neapolitan merchant, is sent to make a deal in Germany by his employer. For most of his life, he had devoted his soul to sin, seduction and profit, disregarding all moral and ethical values. He has committed blasphemy, forgery, murder, and rape, and he is a homosexual. His employer wishes to send him to Germany where nobody knows of his vile ways. There he will meet up with two fellow Neapolitans who are usurers. That night, Ciappelletto has an ominous dream that he is being paraded around while wrapped in a burial shroud while around him friars and monks play volleyball with human skulls. He reaches Germany where he meets up with the two men. They happily sing the Neapolitan song Fenesta ca Lucive together and drink wine but Ciappelletto falls down in a faint. God has punished him with a serious illness that forces him to his death bed. The two men are outraged because if they turn him out they will be seen as bad hosts but if his crimes are revealed in confession they will certainly draw negative attention. Ciappelletto devises a plan to confess and calls a monk to tell him several lies and half-truths that make him seem very pure, while pretending to cringe over venial sins. He tells the monk that he has never slept with a woman (leaving out that he is homosexual) which the monk sees as a very holy and righteous act as he is very handsome. He recalls to the monk that he once cursed his mother for spilling milk and has been tormented by that memory ever since. He also says he is ashamed of spitting in church once. The monk is amazed because he believes Ciappelleto is the most holy man he has ever given confession to. Ciappelleto dies and due to these lies, the people consider him a holy man. After his death, Ciappelletto is revered as a saint. The monk delivers a eulogy to "Saint Ciappelletto" and urges everyone in attendance to take heed and remember his holy actions. He says they should all aim to live as he did. After the eulogy, many poor, disabled and sick people enter the room where Saint Ciappelletto is kept and touch his body in praise. The two Neapolitans look at each other in amazement that his plan worked.

Giotto's Pupil:
In a brief intermission (based on Sixth day, fifth tale), a pupil of the great painter Giotto is on his way to paint the Basilica of Santa Chiara with his companion Messer Forese da Rabatta. The cart he is in is stopped by the rain and they take cover with a toothless farmer nearby named Gennari who gives the passengers clothes. The pupil of Giotto and da Rabatta arrive at the church while dressed in these tattered outfits. The two begin painting the basilica's walls after watching passersby in a market for visual inspiration. He spots some market-goers who will serve as the actors in the next segment about Caterina and Ricciardo. The other stories of the film continue afterwards.

Caterina di Valbona and Riccardo:
In the fifth episode (based on Fifth day, fourth tale), a young woman from Valbona (a town near Naples) named Caterina has fallen in love with a young boy named Ricciardo while playing hide and seek. She is afraid of telling her father as she believes he may be angered. She devises a ruse where she will stay with her lover overnight on a terrace to make love without her parents' knowledge. She tells her mother that the inside of the house is much too warm for her and that she wants to stay outside so she may hear the nightingale sing in the morning. Her parents set up a makeshift bed for her outside where she awaits for Ricciardo. He scales the wall of her house and makes love to her in the makeshift bed. The next morning the girl's father goes outside to find the two lovers sleeping naked, while she is holding his genitals. He runs inside to get his wife telling her that their daughter "caught the nightingale in her hands!" The mother rushes outside to see what the commotion is about and is about to scream when she sees the naked pair. The father covers her mouth and explains that the boy is a good match, as his marriage would earn a significant amount of money through dowry and it would improve their social standing. The father wakes the pair up and tells Ricciardo that the only way he will leave the house alive is if he marries his daughter. Ricciardo agrees and everyone is happy. The father gives Ricciardo a ring and Caterina is married to him right there.

Elizabeth of Messina and Lorenzo the Sicilian:
In the sixth episode (based on Fourth day, Fifth tale), set in Messina, a girl, Elizabeth, attractive and possessing great wealth, falls in love with Lorenzo, a young Sicilian employee of her brothers. However, her brothers discover their love and become furious. They invite Lorenzo to their private garden under the pretenses of having lunch but then stab him in the back with a dagger in order to save their family's honour. They bury Lorenzo's body in the garden. They return to Elizabeth and say that Lorenzo is away on business. Elizabeth spends nights crying over him after which his ghost appears to her in a dream and tells her that he was killed and buried in the family's garden. The next day, Elizabeth asks for permission to go the garden and the brothers give it to her, not suspecting her to know that Lorenzo was killed and buried there. Elizabeth goes to the garden and when she finds the body, she cuts off Lorenzo's head and brings it back to her bedroom. She hides it inside a pot of basil, which she tends to every day.

Gemmata:
In the seventh episode (based on Ninth day, tenth tale), the commoner Pietro and his wife Gemmata have a guest named Don Gianni who is staying with them. Their neighbor Zita is getting married, which means Gemmata can't stay with her, so all three must share the same house. Gemmata and Pietro sleep in the bedroom and Don Gianni is in the stable. Don Gianni, using his cunning, tells Pietro and Gemmata that Gemmata can be turned into horse and then back into a human, so she can be used to sow the fields of her husband's farm. Don Gianni can make this happen only with a special spell. The spell is a ruse: the doctor has imagined a ritual to enable him to have sex with the woman, in full view of her husband. Don Gianni strips Gemmata naked in front of Pietro and grabs her breasts, hair, back and bottom, and describes how each part will appear when she is a mare. At the last part he is about to stick his penis into her and calls it her "tail". Pietro screams that he doesn't want a tail. Don Gianni turns around and tells Pietro that his screaming ruined it so now she can't turn into a horse.

Heaven and Hell:
The eighth episode (based on Seventh day, tenth tale) involves two characters from Naples named Meuccio and Tingoccio who agree to tell each other about Heaven or Hell when they die. After a time, Tingoccio dies. Meuccio is afraid for his soul because he had sex out of wedlock with his girlfriend so many times. One night he has a dream in which his friend tells him that he is in Limbo, and though the angels knew of all his sins they do not consider sex a mortal sin as they had believed. Meuccio runs through the streets to his girlfriend and screams to her "it is not a sin!"

Epilogue:
The final scene returns to the pupil of the painter Giotto, who has completed his fresco, which illustrates episodes of the film. In the final scene, he marvels over his work and says to himself "Why complete a work when it is so much better just to dream it?"

List of tales

 Second day, fifth tale - a young boy from Perugia is swindled twice, but ends up becoming rich.
 Ninth day, second tale - a Mother Superior reprimands a nun for sleeping with a man but it becomes clear she is guilty of the same sin (translated into Neapolitan by an old man and listened to by a crowd).
 Third day, first tale - a man pretends to be a deaf-mute in a convent of curious nuns.
 Seventh day, second tale - a woman must hide her lover when her husband comes home unexpectedly.
 First day, first tale - a scoundrel fools a priest on his deathbed.
 Fifth day, fourth tale - a young girl sleeps on the roof to meet her boyfriend at night.
 Fourth day, fifth tale - three brothers take revenge on their sister's lover.
 Ninth day, tenth tale - a man tries to seduce the wife of his friend.
 Seventh day, tenth tale - two friends make a pact to find out what happens after death.
 Sixth day, fifth tale - two painters are stopped in the rain and are given new clothes.
 Third day, tenth tale - in Tunisia a princess escapes into the wilderness where a monk tricks her into sleeping with him. This scene was removed and is now presumed lost.
 Fourth day, eighth tale - a man goes on a journey to Paris and returns to his hometown to find the woman he loves married. He dies of grief. She sees this and then lays by his side and dies too. This scene was removed and is now presumed lost.

Cast

Production

Filming locations 
 Naples, Italy - the tale of Andreuccio and the tomb robbers.
 Villa Cimbrone, Ravello, Italy - the church of the aroused nuns in the Masetto de Lamprecchio story.
 Loire Valley, Maine-et-Loire, France - the German city in the tale of Ser Ciappalletto.
 Caserta Vecchia, Caserta, Campania, Italy - story of Peronella hiding her lover in a jar.
 Sanaa, Yemen - Gafsa, Tunisia in the Alibech story set in Alibech's palace (deleted and now lost scene).
 Mount Vesuvius, Italy - Rustico's hermit abode in the Sahara desert (deleted and now lost scene).
 Paris, France - tale of Girolamo and Salvestra (deleted and lost scene).
 Safa-Palatino, Rome, Lazio, Italy - miscellaneous interiors

Score
The soundtrack of the film mainly consists of pre-existing music. With consulation of Ennio Morricone, Pier Paolo Pasolini chosen representative examples of Italian folk songs from different localities and Latin mediaeval chants. The album Italian Folk Music, Vol. 5: Naples and Campania compiled by Alan Lomax for Folkways records was heavily drawn from. The following is a list of the musical cues:

 "Zesa Viola/ la Zita in cerca di un marito" (The Maid in Search of a Husband)" - mediaeval Neapolitan song
 "Canto dei portatori" (Porters' Song)" - folkloric Positano chant
 "Serenata popolare campana" (popular Serenade of Campania)" - traditional Cilentan song
 "Canto delle lavandaie del Vomero" (Song of the Washerwomen of Vomero)" - popular Neapolitan song
 "Ballo del tamburo" (Tambourine Dance)" - "tammurriata": the folk dance from Campania
 "Mittit ad virginem" (To the Virgin He Sends)" - Latin sacred chant
 "La pampanella" (The Little Leaf)" - traditional polyphonic singing in the Irpinian dialect
 "Fenesta ca lucive" (The Window That Used to Shine)" - Neapolitan Romantic song
 "Canto delle olivare" (Song of the Olive Trees)" - Neapolitan folk song
 "Veni Sancte Spiritus" - Latin sacred chant
 "La Cammesella" (The Camisole)" - Neapolitan folk song
 "Am blim blom" - Neapolitan Nursery rhyme/"filastrocche"
 "Ninna nanna popolare campana (Popular lullaby from Campania)" - Neapolitan folk song
 "Tarantellа" - vivid Neapolitan dance
 "Canti di venditori (Songs of the Street Vendors)" - mix of different folk songs
 "Mass of Tournai: Kyrie eleison" - mediaeval polyphonic mass in Latin

Deleted scenes
Two scenes were deleted from the film: the story of Girolamo and Salvestra and the story of Rustico and Alibech. Pasolini removed Girolamo because he felt it was a weaker story, and he removed Alibech because he wanted to save the Yemen scenery as a surprise for his later film Arabian Nights, the third film in his Trilogy of Life. Despite much searching by Laura Betti neither have turned up though the Alibech scene still survives on the script and has been recreated using stills from the film. This recreation is available for viewing in the documentary The Lost Body of Alibech.

In Gafsa, the princess Alibech lives with her family in contentment. She is interested in learning about Christianity though her Muslim family try to dissuade her from this. She goes off into the Sahara desert to learn from the desert fathers. She meets two monks who tell her to continue on. She meets a third monk named Rustico and stays with him. He is very aroused by her and tells her that his penis is the Devil and her vagina is Hell and that the Devil must be sent back to Hell by God's own order until "the pride vanishes from his head". They do this six times. Alibech is very interested in continuing with this while Rustico is tired out. Meanwhile, in Gafsa, Alibech's family die in a fire so the warlord Neerbale rides out into the desert with his men to retrieve Alibech and bring her home in safety. They take her away much to Rustico's chagrin. Back in Gafsa, Alibech is bathing. She tells her female servants that it was wrong for Neerbale to steal her away when she was learning about the Christian God and doing such great things as sending the Devil to Hell. They ask her what she means and she explains. They laugh and tell her that Neerbale will do that with her too so she must not worry.

Reception
The Decameron was the third most popular film in Italy in 1971 with 11,167,557 admissions behind The Godfather and the Italian ...continuavano a chiamarlo Trinità. It was the 21st most popular film in Italy of all-time and is currently ranked 25th.

References

External links
 
 
 
 
 The Decameron: The Past Is Present an essay by Colin MacCabe at the Criterion Collection

1971 films
1970s fantasy comedy films
Italian anthology films
The Decameron
1970s Italian-language films
Films based on Italian novels
Films based on works by Giovanni Boccaccio
Films directed by Pier Paolo Pasolini
Films set in the Middle Ages
Italian fantasy comedy films
Films set in Italy
Films set in Naples
Films set in France
Films set in Sicily
Films scored by Ennio Morricone
Films produced by Alberto Grimaldi
Silver Bear Grand Jury Prize winners
1971 comedy films
Films set in Tunisia
Films set in the Holy Roman Empire
1971 LGBT-related films
Films set in Tuscany
Films about deaf people
Films shot at Palatino Studios
Films shot in Yemen
Films shot in Rome
Films about infidelity
Infidelity in fiction
1970s Italian films